Pelican Airport  is located  east of Wabasca, Alberta, Canada.

It is a private aerodrome that serves the Wabasca oil field.

References

Registered aerodromes in Alberta
Municipal District of Opportunity No. 17